William Lawrence Slout (July 17, 1923 – February 4, 2017) was an American professor of theater at California State University, San Bernardino. He wrote Olympians of the Sawdust Circle and other reference books on circus history.

Biography
Slout was born on July 17, 1923 in Charlotte, Michigan. He served in World War II and received a B.A. from Michigan State University in 1947 and an M.A. from Utah State University in 1953. He received a Ph.D. from the University of California, Los Angeles.

Slout died in Redlands, California on February 4, 2017, at the age of 93.

Publications

Author
Theatre in a Tent: The Development of a Provincial Entertainment (1972) 
Olympians of the Sawdust Circle (1998)

Editor
Life upon the Wicked Stage: A Visit to the American Theatre of the 1860s, 1870s, and 1880s As Seen in the Pages of the New York Clipper (Clipper Studies in the Theatre, No. 14, 1996) Old Gotham Theatricals Popular Amusements in Horse and Buggy America Broadway Below the Sidewalk The Theatrical Rambles of Mr. And Mrs. John Greene Clowns and Cannons Amphitheatres and Circuses Ink From a Circus Press Agent A Royal Coupling A Clown's Log Grand Entrée (with Stuart Thayer) Chilly Billy''

References

External links
Circus History

1923 births
2017 deaths
California State University, San Bernardino faculty
Michigan State University alumni
Utah State University alumni
University of California, Los Angeles alumni
People from Charlotte, Michigan